Luxembourg competed at the 1952 Summer Olympics in Helsinki, Finland. 44 competitors, all men, took part in 32 events in 9 sports.

Medalists

Gold
 Josy Barthel — Athletics, Men's 1.500 metres

Athletics

Seven athletes, all male, represented Luxembourg in 1952.

Men's 200 metres
 Fred Hammer
 Roby Schaeffer

Men's 400 metres
 Fred Hammer
 Jean Hamilius
 Gérard Rasquin

Men's 1500 metres
 Josy Barthel

Men's 5000 metres
 Paul Frieden

Men's 110 metres hurdles
 Johny Fonck

Men's 400 metres hurdles
 Johny Fonck

Men's 4 x 400 metres relay
 Fred Hammer
 Jean Hamilius
 Gérard Rasquin
 Roby Schaeffer

Boxing

Men's Light-Welterweight: 
 Fernand Backes 
 Second Round — Lost to Jean Louis Paternotte of Belgium (0 - 3)

Men's Welterweight:
 Jeannot Welter
 First Round — Lost to Franco Vescovi of Italy (0 - 2)

Men's Light-Middleweight: 
 Bruno Matiussi
 First Round — Lost to Guido Mazzinghi of Italy (0 - 3)

Men's Middleweight:
 Alfred Stuermer
 First Round — Lost to Boris Georgiev Nikolov of Bulgaria (0 - 3)

Canoeing

Cycling

Road Competition
Men's Individual Road Race (190.4 km)
André Moes — 5:11:19.0 (→ 11th place)
Roger Ludwig — 5:11:20.0 (→ 14th place)
Josef Schraner — 5:15:06.1 (→ 20th place)
Nicolas Morn — 5:26:25.0 (→ 51st place)
Jean Schmit — did not finish (→ no ranking)

Fencing

Four fencers, all male, represented Luxembourg in 1952.

Men's épée
 Léon Buck
 Émile Gretsch
 Jean-Fernand Leischen

Men's team épée
 Émile Gretsch
 Jean-Fernand Leischen
 Paul Anen
 Léon Buck

Football

Gymnastics

Swimming

Wrestling

References

Nations at the 1952 Summer Olympics
1952
1952 in Luxembourgian sport